Marcelo dos Santos Ferreira (born 27 July 1989), known simply as Marcelo, is a Brazilian professional footballer who plays for Emirati club Dibba Al Fujairah Club as a central defender.

Club career
Marcelo was born in São Carlos, São Paulo. After failing to impose himself at CR Vasco da Gama, he joined amateurs Rio Preto Esporte Clube.

In 2010, Marcelo moved to Portugal, signing with G.D. Ribeirão of the third division. For the 2011–12 season he went straight to the Primeira Liga with Rio Ave FC, being immediately loaned to Leixões SC.

Marcelo made his debut in the Portuguese top flight on 18 August 2012, playing the full 90 minutes in a 0–1 home loss against C.S. Marítimo. At the end of the campaign, in which he started in all his 28 appearances (scoring in a 1–0 win at Gil Vicente F.C. on 13 January 2013) to help his team finish in sixth position, he won the club's Player of the Year award.

On 23 May 2018, Marcelo joined Sporting CP on a free transfer and a three-year contract. On 27 December, however, after only one appearance in the Taça de Portugal and another in the Taça da Liga to his credit, he moved to the Major League Soccer with Chicago Fire FC for a reported €500,000 fee. 

On 14 January 2020, Marcelo left the Soldier Field by mutual consent. Shortly after, he returned to the Portuguese top tier with F.C. Paços de Ferreira.

Marcelo spent the following two seasons in Western Asia, with Al-Tai FC (Saudi Professional League) and Dibba Al Fujairah Club (UAE Pro League).

Honours
Sporting CP
Taça de Portugal: 2018–19
Taça da Liga: 2018–19

Individual
Rio Ave Player of the Year: 2012–13

References

External links

1989 births
Living people
Brazilian footballers
Footballers from São Paulo (state)
Association football defenders
CR Vasco da Gama players
Rio Preto Esporte Clube players
Primeira Liga players
Liga Portugal 2 players
Segunda Divisão players
G.D. Ribeirão players
Rio Ave F.C. players
Leixões S.C. players
Sporting CP footballers
F.C. Paços de Ferreira players
Major League Soccer players
Chicago Fire FC players
Saudi Professional League players
Al-Tai FC players
UAE Pro League players
Dibba FC players
Brazilian expatriate footballers
Expatriate footballers in Portugal
Expatriate soccer players in the United States
Expatriate footballers in Saudi Arabia
Expatriate footballers in the United Arab Emirates
Brazilian expatriate sportspeople in Portugal
Brazilian expatriate sportspeople in the United States
Brazilian expatriate sportspeople in Saudi Arabia
Brazilian expatriate sportspeople in the United Arab Emirates